Eat-me signals are molecules exposed on the surface of a cell to induce phagocytes to phagocytose (eat) that cell. Currently known eat-me signals include: phosphatidylserine, oxidized phospholipids, sugar residues (such as galactose), deoxyribonucleic acid (DNA), calreticulin, annexin A1, histones and pentraxin-3 (PTX3).

The most well characterised eat-me signal is the phospholipid phosphatidylserine. Healthy cells do not expose phosphatidylserine on their surface, whereas dead, dying, infected, injured and some activated cells expose phosphatidylserine on their surface in order to induce phagocytes to phagocytose them. Most glycoproteins and glycolipids on the surface of our cells have short sugar chains that terminate in sialic acid residues, which inhibit phagocytosis, but removal of these residues reveals galactose residues (and subsequently N-acetylglucosamine and mannose residues) that can bind opsonins or directly activate phagocytic receptors. Calreticulin, annexin A1, histones, pentraxin-3 and DNA may be released by (and onto the surface of) dying cells to encourage phagocytes to eat these cells, thereby acting as self-opsonins. Eat-me signals, or the opsonins that bind them, are recognised by phagocytic receptors on phagocytes, inducing engulfment of the cell exposing the eat-me signal.

See also
 Find-me signals

References 

Cell biology
Cellular senescence